Philippe Soupault (2 August 1897 – 12 March 1990) was a French writer and poet, novelist, critic, and political activist. He was active in Dadaism and later was instrumental in founding the Surrealist movement with André Breton. Soupault initiated the periodical Littérature together with writers Breton and Louis Aragon in Paris in 1919, which, for many, marks the beginnings of Surrealism. The first book of automatic writing, Les Champs magnétiques (1920), was co-authored by Soupault and Breton.

Biography 
In 1922 he was asked to reinvent the literary magazine Les Écrits nouveaux, for which he also created an editorial board. In 1927 Soupault, with the help of his then wife Marie-Louise, translated William Blake's Songs of Innocence and Experience into French. The next year, Soupault authored a monograph on Blake, arguing the poet was a "genius" whose work anticipated the Surrealist movement in literature.

In 1933 at a reception at the Soviet Embassy in Paris, he met Ré Richter, and they decided to do some travel reportage together. Ré Richter's photographs, taken with her 6x6 Rolleiflex, were to be published alongside Philippe Soupault's literary texts. In the following years, the two of them continued in the same vein, travelling to Germany, Switzerland, England, Scandinavia and Tunisia. They married in 1937 and separated after the end of the war; he moved back to Europe, and she remained in New York for some time.

Soupault directed Radio Tunis from 1937 until 1940, when he was arrested by the pro-Vichy regime. After imprisonment by the Nazis in Tunis during World War II, he and his wife fled to Algiers. From there, they traveled to the United States. He took a teaching position at Swarthmore College, but returned subsequently to France in October 1945. His works include large volumes of poetry such as Aquarium (1917) and Rose des vents (Compass Card) (1920), and the novel Les Dernières Nuits de Paris (1928; tr. Last Nights of Paris, 1929).

In 1957, he wrote the libretto for Germaine Tailleferre's opera La Petite Sirène, based on Hans Christian Andersen's tale "The Little Mermaid". The work was broadcast by French Radio National in 1959.

Legacy 
In 1990, the year Soupault died, Serbian rock band Bjesovi recorded their version of his poem Georgia in Serbian.

Soupault's short story "Death of Nick Carter" was translated by Robin Walz in 2007, and published in issue 24 of the McSweeney's Quarterly. In 2016, City Lights Bookstore published a book of his essays entitled Lost Profiles: Memoirs of Cubism, Dada, and Surrealism as translated by Alan Bernheimer.

Works
 Aquarium (1917)
 Rose des vents (1919)
 Les Champs magnétiques, (1919, in association with A. Breton)
 L’Invitation au suicide (1921)
 Westwego (1922)
 Le Bon Apôtre (1923, novel)
 Les Frères Durandeau (1924, novel)
 Georgia (1926)
 Le Nègre (1927, novel)
 Les Dernières Nuits de Paris (1928, novel).
 Le Grand Homme (1929, novel)
 Les Moribonds (1934, autobiographical novel)
 Il y a un océan (1936)
 Odes à Londres bombardée (1944)
 Le Temps des assassins (1945, sequel of autobiography)
 Odes (1946)
 L’Arme secrète (1946)
 Message de l'île déserte (1947)
 Chansons (1949)
 Sans phrases (1953)
 Profils perdus (1963)
 Lost Profiles: Memoirs of Cubism, Dada, and Surrealism. Translated from the French by Alan Bernheimer (City Lights Publishers), 2016 
 Arc-en-ciel (1979)
 Mémoires de l’oubli (1981, autobiography)
 Poèmes retrouvés (1982)

References

External links
 

1897 births
1990 deaths
People from Chaville
Dada
French surrealist writers
Surrealist poets
20th-century French poets
20th-century French novelists
French critics
French opera librettists
Swarthmore College faculty
French male poets
French male novelists
French male short story writers
French short story writers
French male dramatists and playwrights
20th-century French dramatists and playwrights
20th-century short story writers
20th-century French male writers
French male non-fiction writers